Muslims in India is a book by Abul Hasan Ali Hasani Nadwi, originally written in Arabic as Al Muslimun fil Hind. It is a historical illustration of Indian Muslims and their religious, educational, and cultural struggle. It was published from Dar Ibn Kathir in 1953. It's English translation was rendered by Mohammad Asif Kidwai.

Description 
It's originally delivered in Arabic and afterwards translated into Urdu and later into English as Muslims in India. The role of Islam and Muslims in the history of India has been deliberately distorted, first by western writers, to serve their vested interests in India; by the socialist and secular historian blinded by ideological baggage, Hindu extremist writers because of their jaundiced views about it and as well by the Muslims apologetic writers. As, Maulana Nadwi himself writes:

To dispel misconception created by some misinformation about the role of Muslims in India, Nadwi's book considered as the most useful publication on the subject, which has given an apt respond to those historians, who consider the period of Islamic dominations as a Dark Age in the history of this subcontinent. Published in 1953 C.E. when Muslims in India were in desperate search for such objective writing, projected the real image with accuracy to ward off senseless onslaughts on their identity and existence in their very homeland. This comprehensive but a brief book is highly useful because it is not possible for all to read other voluminous work in Persian and even in Urdu of the old style to enquire into the manifold cultural, literacy, material, and political achievements of Muslim period in Indian history. Therefore, this book of Nadwi gives detailed exposition of Muslim genuineness that has gone into the making of Indian history and culture. Their presence at every form of life throughout the most important period of Indian history drew out the best in them, laying the foundation of a broad-based and composite culture. The contribution of Muslims at all levels of life and society left its multi-dimensional impression on almost all human activity, including statecraft and land management. He demonstrated the role played by the Muslims in the progress and development of the motherland, the achievements of Muslim scholars and their contribution and role of Muslims in the freedom struggle of India. In the words of Nadwi,

References

External links 
English Translation

1953 non-fiction books
Indian books
History of Islam
Books by Abul Hasan Ali Hasani Nadwi
Deobandi literature
1953 books
History of India
Islam in India